The 1935–36 season was Chelsea Football Club's twenty-seventh competitive season. In October 1935, Claude Kirby died. He had been Chelsea chairman since the club's foundation in 1905 and was succeeded by Charles Pratt, Sr. Also in October, a crowd of 82,905 attended Chelsea's First Division match against Arsenal at Stamford Bridge, setting a club record which still stands.

Table

Notes

References

External links
 1935–36 season at stamford-bridge.com

1935–36
English football clubs 1935–36 season